Carman Kerr is a Canadian politician, who was elected to the Nova Scotia House of Assembly in the 2021 Nova Scotia general election. He represents the riding of Annapolis as a member of the Nova Scotia Liberal Party.

Prior to becoming an MLA, Mr. Kerr worked in the tourism sector. He is a member of the Natural Resources and Economic Development Committee.

Bills introduced

Electoral record

References

Year of birth missing (living people)
Living people
Nova Scotia Liberal Party MLAs
21st-century Canadian politicians
People from Annapolis County, Nova Scotia